The 1991 Australian Touring Car Championship was a CAMS sanctioned motor racing title open to Group 3A Touring Cars. The title, which was the 32nd Australian Touring Car Championship, was contested over a nine-round series which began on 24 February 1991 at Sandown Raceway and ended on 11 August at Oran Park Raceway, The series was promoted as the Shell Australian Touring Car Championship and was won by Jim Richards driving a Nissan Skyline GT-R.

Teams and drivers

The following teams and drivers competed in the 1991 Australian Touring Car Championship.

Changes
With Australia in the middle of an economic downturn (the "Recession we had to have" according to Federal Treasurer Paul Keating), entry numbers were significantly down on 1990 at almost every round, with only eleven cars appearing at Wanneroo Raceway. Notable absentees included Allan Moffat Racing and Toyota Team Australia, while Peter Brock closed his Mobil 1 Racing team (effectively bringing to an end the old Holden Dealer Team which had been established in 1969) and took his Mobil sponsorship to Perkins Engineering, reuniting with his Bathurst 1000 winning co-driver of 1982, 1983 and 1984, Larry Perkins in a pair of new Holden VN Commodore SS Group A SV's.

Tony Longhurst's Benson & Hedges Racing abandoned their powerful but tyre shredding Ford Sierra RS500's and became Australia's factory BMW team, racing two former Schnitzer Motorsport BMW M3 Evolutions which included upgraded front and rear spoilers as well as an increase in engine size from 2.3 to 2.5L for the 4 cyl engine. The cars were delivered to the team's Gold Coast base after the Wellington 500 in December 1990, though under the Group A rules as used by CAMS the cars did not have the ABS that they ran in the German DTM series. Team owners Longhurst and Frank Gardner had a previous association with BMW and the M3, Longhurst having raced a M3 for Gardner's factory backed JPS Team BMW in 1987, while the JPS team had used a variety of BMW's between 1981 and 1987.

With the economic downturn making it unlikely Holden Special Vehicles would be able to sell the required 500 evolution VN Commodore SS Group A SV's to make it eligible for Group A competition (they ended up building only 320), CAMS gave dispensation for the model to race and thus the bigger budget Holden teams (HRT and Brock/Perkins) upgraded. Some of the privateers, notably the Lansvale Smash Repairs team and Terry Finnigan also upgraded to the VN, but most Holden privateers continued to race the previous VL model. The VN Commodore had been released back in August 1988, and would be superseded by the VP in October 1991. The Commodore's did get other concessions from CAMS, including losing some 75 kg to bring the minimum weight of the car down to only 1250 kg and the homologation of a 6-speed gearbox in mid-year.

The Gibson Motorsport run Nissan Skyline R32 GT-R's were basically as they had finished 1990.

Although the Ford Sierra's had lost numbers with the Brock and Longhurst teams now driving Holden and BMW's respectively, the 4 cyl turbo Ford's were still one of the fastest cars on the grid. Like the Commodore's, the Sierra's would also benefit from a mid-season homologation of a 6-speed gearbox.

Season review
The season was dominated by Nissan Motor Sport. The team's two drivers won seven of the nine rounds between them, with six of those victories being part of 1-2 finishes. Mark Skaife scored more championship points than any other driver, but with each driver having to drop their worst round (if they actually scored points in all nine rounds), Skaife lost ten points from his fourth at Round 8 at Lakeside, giving the title to his teammate and defending champion, Jim Richards who only scored in the first eight rounds after failing to finish the Grand Finale at Oran Park. This continued the New Zealand domination of the Championship in the Group A era, with New Zealand drivers having won five of the seven Australian Touring Car Championships held under those regulations (Richards in 1985, 1987, 1990 and 1991 with Robbie Francevic winning in 1986), the only Australian winner being 1988 and 1989 champion Dick Johnson.

Third place was claimed by Tony Longhurst who won two rounds, at Amaroo Park and Lakeside International Raceway in his Benson & Hedges BMW M3 Evolution. BMW's return with a top line team was underlined by teammate,  Formula One World Drivers' Champion Alan Jones, finishing fourth in the points after finishing the championship strongly with consecutive second placings in the final two rounds. During the series, the BMW, which were the lightest outright cars (which helped their tyre wear and gave a braking advantage), became the only consistent challengers to the GT-Rs.

1991 also saw the return of Peter Brock to Holden for the first time since 1987. After racing BMW's in 1988 followed by two seasons running Andy Rouse sourced Ford Sierras which had seen Brock finish 3rd and 2nd in the championship, Brock teamed with former Holden Dealer Team co-driver/manager Larry Perkins in two Perkins Engineering built Holden VN Commodore SS Group A SV's, and while initially they were off the pace due to the lack of suitable Bridgestone tyres, this was rectified by halfway through the series and Brock in particular became a regular challenger with strong qualifying performances, though the heavy Commodore's still to be hard on tyres in the ATCC's sprint race format. Brock finished 6th in the championship while Perkins finished in 11th place. In a 2014 interview with Australian Muscle Car magazine, Perkins would claim that part of the contract with Brock and his main sponsor Mobil stated that in championship races, he was not allowed to finish ahead of Brock unless it was unavoidable.

Brock and Perkins were joined in the fight for Holden by Holden Racing Team manager Win Percy who also had a strong season in his VN Commodore. Percy's 4th place at Amaroo Park was the best finish for a Commodore through the series and he surprised everyone when he qualified second in rounds 2 and 3 at Symmons Plains and Wanneroo. Percy finished the series in 8th place, one place ahead of five time ATCC champion Dick Johnson who endured a miserable series in his Sierra, his best finish being 4th in the opening round at Sandown Raceway.

Results and standings

Race calendar
The 1991 Australian Touring Car Championship was contested over a nine-round series with one race per round. Each round was of approximately 50 minutes duration.

Championship standings
Championship points were awarded on a 20–15–12–10–8–6–4–3–2–1 basis for the top ten positions at each round. Each driver was required to drop any points earned from the worst round result.

Positions shown within brackets are those for which drivers were awarded points that were not counted towards championship totals.

See also
1991 Australian Touring Car season

References

External links
 Official V8 Supercar site Contains historical ATCC information.
 1991 Australian Touring Car images, autopics.com.au

Australian Touring Car Championship seasons
Touring Cars